The Vienna Football Association (German: Wiener Fußball-Verband; WFV) is the umbrella organization of the football clubs of the Austrian state Vienna. The WFV was founded in 1923 and has its headquarters in Vienna.

The WFV is one of 8 regional organizations of the Austrian Football Association (ÖFB).

In 2015, WFV had 28,000 members from 269 football clubs with 998 teams.

References

External links
  

Football in Austria
Sport in Vienna
Sports organizations established in 1923
1923 establishments in Austria